The 1869 Open Championship was the tenth Open Championship and was held on 16 September at Prestwick Golf Club. Tom Morris, Jr. won the championship for the second successive time, by 11 strokes from Bob Kirk. Just 14 players entered the Championship.

Tom Morris, Jr. dominated the championship, leading by three strokes after the first round, four after second and eventually winning by 11 strokes. After the first round Davie Strath and Bob Kirk were both three shots behind Morris. Strath was in second place after two rounds but finished with a 60 to finish third behind Kirk who scored 57.

Morris's first round included a hole-in-one at the 8th hole and his total of 50 (6-4-4-6-5-5-3-1-6-3-3-4) was only one behind his record of the previous year. In the second round Kirk took four strokes in one bunker (the "Alps"), scoring 10, while in the last round he took three shots in another (the "Cardinal's Nob"). He had four twos over the three rounds.

Final leaderboard
Source:

Thursday, 16 September 1869

The remaining five players withdrew and did not complete the 36 holes.

References

External links
Prestwick 1869 (Official site)

The Open Championship
Golf tournaments in Scotland
Open Championship
Open Championship
Open Championship